William of Exeter was physician to Queen Philippa, and held a variety of church preferments; including Chancellor of Lincoln, Treasurer of Chichester, and Provost of Holyhead. In addition to his physician role to the queen, he was also Clerk to the King, and was a trusted diplomat, responsible for negotiations with France. Like all medieval physicians, he held double doctorates: one in medicine, the other in theology. He is also said to have graduated in arts.

References

Year of birth missing
Year of death missing
14th-century English medical doctors
Medieval English diplomats
14th-century diplomats